La Chanson de Craonne (English: The Song of Craonne) is an anti-military song of World War I written in 1917.  The song was written to the tune of Bonsoir M'Amour (Charles Sablon), sung by Emma Liebel. It is sometimes known by the first line of the chorus, Adieu la vie (Goodbye to life).

History
This song was sung by the French soldiers who mutinied (in sixty eight of the one hundred and ten divisions of the French Army) after the costly and militarily disastrous offensive of General Robert Nivelle at the Chemin des Dames, spring 1917.

The song was prohibited in France until 1974. Even though an award of 1 million francs and the immediate honorable release from the army were offered for revealing the maker, the original author of the song remained unknown.

These revolts brought about severe reprimands, notably by General Philippe Pétain, who was named on 17 May as the replacement for General Nivelle.  He was directly tasked with the mission of rebuilding the sagging morale of the war-weary French Army.  He went about this with the punishment of the leaders of the mutiny, condemning 554 to death, though only 26 were actually executed. He also improved conditions of the soldiers with better food, better cantonments, better organization for military leaves, and suspended the deadly offensives to limit the casualties.

Origin of the Song
This song was anonymously created, though surely by many authors.  The song constantly evolved during the course of the war due to the changing role of those engaged in combat.  The song first appeared under the name La Chanson de Lorette evoking the Battle of Lorette à Ablain-St. Nazaire that occurred between the twelve months of October 1914 and October 1915.  The song was modified in order to sing about the Second Battle of Champagne.  In 1916, the song was sung during the ghastly Battle of Verdun, with the refrain:
Adieu la vie, adieu l'amour,  
Adieu toutes les femmes
C'est pas fini, c'est pour toujours
De cette guerre infâme
C'est à Verdun, au fort de Vaux
Qu'on a risqué sa peau

La Chanson de Craonne
The final version, "The Song of Craonne" was written in 1917 during the French Army's Mutinies.  The village of Craonne on the plateau of Californie was the site of bloody fighting on 16 April 1917 during Nivelle's failed Offensives.  It was these bloody offensives that pushed the French Army over the edge.

Verses

English

After the war this song was not allowed at all on French airwaves.  The writer Paul Vaillant-Couturier, who was also a World War I veteran, preserved the song, and later had it published.

In film
The song's chorus is sung in Oh! What a Lovely War (1969).
The song is sung by a soldier in A Very Long Engagement (2004).

References

Anti-war songs
Songs about the military
Songs about France
Songs about cities
1917 songs
French songs